Kube (Hube) and Tobo, also Mongi, are a Papuan language spoken in Morobe Province, Papua New Guinea.  They are mutually intelligible and 95% lexicostatistically cognate. Dialects of Kube include Kurungtufu and Yoangen (Yoanggeng).

The Kube alphabet includes the letter Q with hook tail, .

Phonology

Vowels (orthographic)

Consonants (orthographic)

References

Languages of Morobe Province
Huon languages